Jatheon Technologies, Inc. is a privately-held company founded in 2004 providing various products for the archiving of email, social media and other unstructured data with a  focus on highly regulated industries such as education, healthcare, government, financial and legal works. The company is based in Toronto, Ontario, Canada, in Northern America.

The company's products are intended to capture, index and store email, instant messages, social media content, text messages, calls and voicemail to enable organizations to respond to eDiscovery requests and meet various regulatory compliance requirements such as Sarbanes Oxley, HIPAA, and others. The email archiving appliances are installed in an organization's network and capture messaging traffic within the network. The products are compatible with all major mail servers, including Exchange, Office 365, Groupwise, Gmail and IBM Lotus, etc.

History 
In December 2009, the company announced a partnership with Dell. Under the partnership, four new products combining Dell's PowerEdge R610 and R710 server technology, Dell's PowerVault MD1000 storage arrays, and Jatheon's email archiving and management software in various virtual storage configurations were launched.

In June 2014, Jatheon Technologies redesigned its entire family of PnC-based email and message archiving products for companies that require full regulatory compliance, internal policy management and storage space management. The product refresh established a new naming convention.

In 2017, the company launched a social media and mobile communications archiving functionality.

Acquisitions 
In June 2009, the company acquired the ongoing operations and support of NorthSeas AMT customers.

In 2010, Jatheon acquired the operations of TrendMicro, respectively.

Industry recognitions 
Jatheon is the recipient of Deloitte's Top 10 Companies to Watch Award (2006) and InfoTech's Value Champion Award (2012). In 2009, the company was included in Gartner's Email Archiving Vendors Report.

In 2016, 2018 and 2019, Jatheon Technologies Inc. was included in The Radicati Group's Information Archiving Market Quadrant as a Specialist.

References

External links 

Evident domain @ SC Magazine
Tips For Smoother Email Archiving  @ Processor.com
10 Technologies and 20 Vendors You Should Know for 2008 @ Channel Insider

Computer Technology Review's first Annual E-Discovery Product Roundup @ Computer Technology Review
E-mail archiving vendor Jatheon goes back to its Canadian roots @ ItBusiness.ca

Computer companies established in 2004
Companies based in Toronto
Email
Computer archives